Very Small Business is an Australian television comedy series first broadcast on Wednesday 3 September 2008 on ABC1. The series is written by Wayne Hope, Gary McCaffrie, and Robyn Butler, and produced by Hope and Butler. It comprises fourteen half-hour episodes.

A new season began screening in September 2018 titled Back in Very Small Business. It comprises six half-hour episodes.

Synopsis
Don Angel is the small business owner of the Worldwide Business Group, a business he's trying to grow. This business includes publishing of dubious niche magazines such as Feelin' Great, Railway Union Monthly and Music, Music, Music, Music - mere vehicles used by smooth-talking Don to sell advertising space to unsuspecting businesses. He's just hired Ray Leonard, a down-and-out former journalist for The Australian, as his senior journalist and sole employee.

Cast
 Wayne Hope as Don Angel/Marcus Goode/James White/Haydn King/Kerry Akermanis/Pete Mandela
 Kym Gyngell as Ray Leonard Leonard/Harvey Bunning
 Roman Hadley-Lund as Leslie Leonard
 Queenie van de Zandt as Tina
 Geoff Paine as Lloyd
 Molly Daniels as Sam Angel
 Sally Cooper as Janet Wilson
 Marg Downey as Yvonne
 Steve Mouzakis as Rolf
 Brian Vriends as Jerome
 Jeremy Kewley as Ron Greally
 Katerina Kotsonis as Blanca
 Ian Bliss as Tony Orsini
 David James as Sol Dolman
 Beejan Land as Lynton McGyver

Episodes

Season 1 "Very Small Business"

Season 2 "Back in Very Small Business"

DVD release

Very Small Business

See also
 List of Australian television series
 List of Australian Broadcasting Corporation programs
 The Librarians

References

External links
 (No longer in use)
 Very Small Business on ABC TV
 
 

2008 Australian television series debuts
Australian television sitcoms
Australian Broadcasting Corporation original programming
2008 Australian television series endings